John Henry "Barnie" Barnhill (February 23, 1903 – October 21, 1973) was an American football player and coach and college athletics administrator.  He served as the head coach at the University of Tennessee (1941–1945) and the University of Arkansas (1946–1949), compiling a record of 54–22–5.

Tennessee
Barnhill was an All-Southern lineman under coach Robert Neyland at the University of Tennessee, including the SoCon champion 1927 team. As a player, he weighed 175 pounds.

Coaching and administrative career
Barnhill was the head coach for the University of Tennessee for four seasons from 1941 to 1945. He coached the team during World War II, managing the squad during the absence of General Robert Neyland, who left for the war.  During that period he led Tennessee to a record of 32–5–2.

In 1946, after Neyland's return to Tennessee, Barnhill was hired by the University of Arkansas as both head football coach and athletic director. Barnhill gave up the head coaching position in 1949 after being diagnosed with multiple sclerosis. He continued as athletic director at Arkansas until 1971 and was responsible for hiring head coach Frank Broyles, who ultimately replaced Barnhill as athletic director.

Death and honors
Barnhill died of heart failure on October 21, 1973, at a hospital in Fayetteville, Arkansas.

Barnhill Arena, the former men's basketball and current women's athletic facility at the University of Arkansas, was named for him.  Barnhill is a member of both the Arkansas Sports Hall of Fame and the Tennessee Sports Hall of Fame.

Head coaching record

References

External links
 Encyclopedia of Arkansas profile

1903 births
1973 deaths
American football guards
Arkansas Razorbacks athletic directors
Arkansas Razorbacks football coaches
People from Savannah, Tennessee
Tennessee Volunteers and Lady Volunteers athletic directors
Tennessee Volunteers football coaches
Tennessee Volunteers football players
University of Memphis alumni
All-Southern college football players
Players of American football from Tennessee